Pinchas Lapide (28 November 1922 – 23 October 1997) was a Jewish theologian and Israeli historian. He was an Israeli diplomat from 1951 to 1969, among other position acting as Israeli Consul to Milan, and was instrumental in gaining recognition for the young state of Israel. He wrote more than 35 books during his lifetime. Lapide was married to Ruth Lapide with whom he shared his interests and endeavors.

Three Popes and the Jews
In 1967 Lapide published his book "Three Popes and the Jews" which set out to answer the charges raised in Rolf Hochhuth's play The Deputy which contained criticisms of World War II Pope Pius XII and his response to the unfolding Holocaust.

Lapide credits Pope Pius XII for heading the effort to save hundreds of thousands of Jewish lives:
...the Catholic Church, under the pontificate of Pius XII was instrumental in saving at least 700,000, but probably as many as 860,000, Jews from certain death at Nazi hands.... These figures, small as they are in comparison with our six million martyrs whose fate is beyond consolation, exceed by far those saved by all other churches, religious institutions and rescue organizations combined.

After analyzing the available information he concludes:
Were I a Catholic, perhaps I should have expected the Pope, as the avowed representative of Christ on earth, to speak out for justice and against murder - irrespective of the consequences. But as a Jew, I view the Church and the Papacy as human institutions, as frail and fallible as all the rest of us. Frail and fallible, Pius had choices thrust upon him time and time again, which would have made a lesser man falter. The 261st Pope was, after all, merely the First Catholic, heir to many prejudices of his predecessors and shortcomings of his 500 million fellow believers. The primary guilt for the slaughter of a third of my people is that of the Nazis who perpetrated the holocaust. But the secondary guilt lies in the universal failure of Christendom to try and avert or, at least, mitigate the disaster; to live up to its own ethical and moral principles, when conscience cried out: Save!, whilst expediency counselled aloofness. Accomplices are all those countless millions who knew my brothers were dying, but yet chose not to see, refused to help and kept their peace. Only against the background of such monumental egotism, within the context of millennial Christian anti-Judaism, can one begin to appraise the Pope's wartime record. When armed force ruled well-nigh omnipotent, and morality was at its lowest ebb, Pius XII commanded none of the former and could only appeal to the latter, in confronting, with bare hands, the full might of evil. A sounding protest, which might turn out to be self-thwarting - or quiet, piecemeal rescue? Loud words - or prudent deeds? The dilemma must have been sheer agony, for which ever course he chose, horrible consequences were inevitable. Unable to cure the sickness of an entire civilization, and unwilling to bear the brunt of Hitler's fury, the Pope, unlike many far mightier than he, alleviated, relieved, retrieved, appealed, petitioned - and saved as best he could by his own lights. Who, but a prophet or a martyr could have done much more?.

Lapide quoted approvingly Samuel Taylor Coleridge’s observation that  "He who begins by loving Christianity better than truth will proceed by loving his own sect or church better than Christianity, and end by loving himself better than all."

Jesus and Lapide
In his dialogue with German reformed theologian Jürgen Moltmann, Lapide says:

"On page 139 of his book The Church in the Power of the Spirit (New York: Harper & Row, Publishers, 1977) it says: Through his crucifixion Christ has become the Saviour of the Gentiles. But in his parousia he will also manifest himself as Israel's Messiah.

I find this sentence an acceptable formula of reconciliation."

Moltmann's compelling response:

"Christendom can gain salvation only together with Israel. The Christians will one day be asked, Where are your Jewish brothers and sisters? The church will one day be asked, Where have you left Israel? For the sake of the Jew Jesus there is no ultimate separation between church and Israel. For the sake of the gospel there is provisionally, before the eschatological future, also no fusion. But there is the communal way of the hoping ones."

In their common declaration, Lapide and Moltmann acknowledge that the diverging paths of Christianity and Judaism may only be as consequential as the man-made barriers that hinder rapprochement. Both agree that Christianity and Judaism are pilgrim's paths to the same God.

In another debate on the messianic connotations of Isaiah 53 with Walter C. Kaiser Jr., Lapide posits that the people of Israel collectively are the expiatory lamb of mankind; God visits the sin of Israel with the full impact in order to let guilty mankind survive, a position that Kaiser thought could be interpreted as being close to the traditional evangelical Christian interpretation of Isaiah 53. The interpretation of Israel as a guilt offering is less clear in the mind of Kaiser, when comparing Isaiah 29:13 with Isaiah 53:9:

He was assigned a grave with the wicked,
    and with the rich in his death,
though he had done no violence,
    nor was any deceit in his mouth
    (Isaiah 53:9 NIV)

“These people come near to me with their mouth
    and honor me with their lips,
    but their hearts are far from me.
    (Isaiah 29:13 NIV)

In responding, Lapide sees the selfless sacrifice of the Jewish prophets as synonymous with Israel becoming acceptable through the imputed righteousness of God. Likewise, he understands Jesus' suffering in the context of Isaiah 53 as a microcosm of the suffering of Israel as a people.

To conclude, Lapide accepts Jesus as the Messiah of the Gentiles, a position he substantiates more clearly in his book The Resurrection of Jesus: A Jewish Perspective. Furthermore, he suggests that the return of Jesus in the parousia will show him to be Israel's Messiah. Just as his interfaith agenda prescribed his presentation of Jesus, the same can be said of his unfamiliar and relatively non-threatening portrayal of Paul.

Works 
 Der Prophet von San Nicandro. Vogt, Berlin 1963, Matthias-Grünewald-Verlag, Mainz 1986. 
 Rom und die Juden. Gerhard Hess, Ulm 1967, 1997, 2005 (3.verb.Aufl.). 
 Three Popes and the Jews. 1967.
 Nach der Gottesfinsternis. Schriftenmissions-Verl., Gladbeck 1970.
 Auferstehung. Calwer, Stuttgart 1977, 1991 (6.Aufl.). 
 Die Verwendung des Hebräischen in den christlichen Religionsgemeinschaften mit besonderer Berücksichtigung des Landes Israel. Diss. Kleikamp, Köln 1971.
 Er predigte in ihren Synagogen. Mohn, Gütersloh 1980, 2004 (8.Aufl.). 
 Am Scheitern hoffen lernen. Mohn, Gütersloh 1985, 1988. 
 Wer war schuld an Jesu Tod? Mohn, Gütersloh 1987, 1989, 2000 (4.Aufl.). 
 Ist das nicht Josephs Sohn? Jesus im heutigen Judentum. Mohn, Gütersloh 1988 .  Ist die Bibel richtig übersetzt?" 2 Bd. Mohn, Gütersloh 2004. 
 Der Jude Jesus. Patmos, Düsseldorf 1979, 2003 (3.Aufl.). 
 Paulus zwischen Damaskus und Qumran. Mohn, Gütersloh 1993, 1995, 2001. 
 The Resurrection of Jesus: A Jewish Perspective [Paperback] Pinchas Lapide, Wipf & Stock Pub, 2002. 
 Jewish monotheism and Christian trinitarian doctrine: A dialogue  [Paperback] Pinchas Lapide, Fortress Press (1981),

Bibliography 
 In the Spirit of Humanity, a portrait of Pinchas Lapide. In: German Comments. review of politics and culture. Fromm, Osnabrück 32.1993,10 (Oktober). 
 Juden und Christen im Dialog. Pinchas Lapide zum 70. Geburtstag. Kleine Hohenheimer Reihe. Bd 25. Akad. der Diözese, Rottenburg-Stuttgart 1993. 
 Christoph Möhl: Sein grosses Thema: Die Juden und die Christen. In: Reformierte Presse. Fischer, Zürich 1997, 47.
 In memoriam Pinchas Lapide (1922–1997) - Stimme der Versöhnung. Ansprachen, Reden, Einreden. Bd 8. Kath. Akad., Hamburg 1999. 
 Ruth Lapide: Pinchas Lapide - Leben und Werk. In: Viktor E. Frankl: Gottsuche und Sinnfrage. Mohn, Gütersloher 2005, S.23.

References

20th-century Israeli philosophers
Jewish theologians
1922 births
Diplomats from Vienna
Jewish emigrants from Austria to Mandatory Palestine after the Anschluss
1997 deaths
Commanders Crosses of the Order of Merit of the Federal Republic of Germany
Israeli consuls
Israeli diplomats
Israeli male writers
Israeli historians of religion
Christian and Jewish interfaith dialogue